Glenn Beauchamp (born 17 January 1962) is a Canadian judoka. He competed at the 1984 Summer Olympics and the 1988 Summer Olympics.

See also
 Judo in Ontario
Judo in Canada
 List of Canadian judoka

References

External links
 

1962 births
Living people
Canadian male judoka
Olympic judoka of Canada
Judoka at the 1984 Summer Olympics
Judoka at the 1988 Summer Olympics
Sportspeople from Toronto
Universiade silver medalists for Canada
Universiade medalists in judo
Medalists at the 1985 Summer Universiade
20th-century Canadian people
21st-century Canadian people